An AF-Nest or Atrial Fibrillation Nest (AFN) is a locus or cluster in the atrial wall with distinct electrical features and properties originated by fibrillar myocardium. It plays as an "electrical multiplier" re-feeding the atrial fibrillation.

One of the currently existing techniques to treat atrial fibrillation (AF) is based on thermo-coagulation of AFN. They are typically numerous at the pulmonary veins antrum. Several evidences have shown that the AFNs represent the true substrate of the AF. A large number of congenital and acquired conditions may cause this type of myocardium. The higher the number of AFNs the easier the initiation and the longer the AF maintenance. Despite being fundamental in the AF physiopathology the long-lasting AF depends on additional factors. The most important is the "Background Tachycardia" (BKT) which is a focal reentrant tachycardia caused by "Fractal Micro-Reentry". This special tachycardia exists even during AF, keeping the AFNs in a high frequency activation. This tachycardia has a unique mechanism of "protection" that prevents it from being reverted by the large amount of surrounding stimuli generated by the AF itself.

Recent studies have shown that the BKT occurs within a more developed AFN or when there is a confluence of two or more of these elements. By using spectral analysis, it is possible to observe that the "Fractal Micro-Reentry" phenomenon tends to occur depending on a critical amount of fibrillar myocardium. This is a small point in the atrial wall with numerous micro-reentries (in a three-dimensional model) inside the AFN, caused by "cellular electrical disconnection" with progressive dichotomy (biological fractal phenomenon), even without the presence of fibrosis and without the need of major histological changes. By this way, it may be present even in normal hearts that explains the "Lone Atrial Fibrillation". This intense micro-electrical activity stimulates the surrounding atrial myocardium that accepts the activation according to its refractory period. This produces a slightly irregular focal tachycardia, known as "Background Tachycardia" responsible for AF maintenance with or without the contribution of many others AFNs or even of other BKT. The greater the number of these elements is the longer the AF may last even becoming permanent.

References

 Pachon M JC, Pachon M EI, Pachon M JC, Lobo TJ, Pachon MZ, Vargas RN, Pachon DQ, Lopez M FJ, Jatene AD. A new treatment for atrial fibrillation based on spectral analysis to guide the catheter RF-ablation. Europace. 2004 Nov;6(6):590-601. Erratum in: Europace. 2005 Jan;7(1):92-3. PubMed .
 United States Patent 8,216,228 - Pachon Mateos, et al. July 10, 2012
 Mateos JC, Mateos EI, Lobo TJ, Pachón MZ, Mateos JC, Pachón DQ, Vargas RN, Piegas LS, Jatene AD. Radiofrequency catheter ablation of atrial fibrillation guided by spectral mapping of atrial fibrillation nests in sinus rhythm. Arq Bras Cardiol. 2007 Sep;89(3):124-34, 140–50. English, Portuguese. PubMed .
 Arruda M, Natale A. Ablation of permanent AF: adjunctive strategies to pulmonary veins isolation: targeting AF NEST in sinus rhythm and CFAE in AF. J Interv Card Electrophysiol. 2008 Oct;23(1):51-7. doi: 10.1007/s10840-008-9252-z. Epub 2008 Jul 15. PubMed .
 Oh S, Kong HJ, Choi EK, Kim HC, Choi YS. Complex fractionated electrograms and AF nests in vagally mediated atrial fibrillation. Pacing Clin Electrophysiol. 2010 Dec;33(12):1497-503. doi: 10.1111/j.1540-8159.2010.02834.x. PubMed .
 Lin YJ, Chang SL, Lo LW, Hu YF, Suenari K, Li CH, Chao TF, Chung FP, Liao JN, Hartono B, Tso HW, Tsao HM, Huang JL, Kao T, Chen SA. A prospective, randomized comparison of modified pulmonary vein isolation versus conventional pulmonary vein isolation in patients with paroxysmal atrial fibrillation. J Cardiovasc Electrophysiol. 2012 Nov;23(11):1155-62. doi: 10.1111/j.1540-8167.2012.02379.x. Epub 2012 Jun 15. PubMed .

Cardiology